J.H. Haag House is a historic home located at Garrett, DeKalb County, Indiana.  It was built about 1875, and is a two-story, Italianate-style brick dwelling. It has a cross gable roof and two-story gabled wing.

It was added to the National Register of Historic Places in 1983.

References

Houses on the National Register of Historic Places in Indiana
Italianate architecture in Indiana
Houses completed in 1875
Houses in DeKalb County, Indiana
National Register of Historic Places in DeKalb County, Indiana